The hornlip mullet (Plicomugil labiosus) is a species of fish in the mullet family from the Indo-Pacific from the Red Sea to Micronesia. It is the only species in the monospecific genus Plicomugil.

References

External links
 
 

Mugilidae
Fish described in 1836